During the 2017–18 season, UD Las Palmas are participating in La Liga and the Copa del Rey.

Squad
.

Reserve team

Transfers
List of Spanish football transfers summer 2017#Las Palmas

In

Out

Competitions

Overall

Liga

League table

Matches

Copa del Rey

Round of 32

Round of 16

Statistics

Appearances and goals
Last updated on 22 December 2017.

|-
! colspan=14 style=background:#dcdcdc; text-align:center|Goalkeepers

|-
! colspan=14 style=background:#dcdcdc; text-align:center|Defenders

|-
! colspan=14 style=background:#dcdcdc; text-align:center|Midfielders

|-
! colspan=14 style=background:#dcdcdc; text-align:center|Forwards

|-
! colspan=14 style=background:#dcdcdc; text-align:center| Players who have made an appearance or had a squad number this season but have left the club, permanently, or on loan

|-
|}

Cards
Accounts for all competitions. Last updated on 22 December 2017.

Clean sheets
Last updated on 22 December 2017.

References

UD Las Palmas seasons
UD Las Palmas